Eriogaster catax, the eastern eggar, is a species of moth in the family Lasiocampidae.

Description
This species shows a pronounced sexual dimorphism. The males are smaller and have feathery antennae. In males the basal part of the front wing is yellow-orange, while the outer part is pinkish-brown. In the females the front wings are browner. In both sexes, the front wings show a transversal line and a white discal spot within a dark border. Hind wings have no markings. Females are larger and at the end of the abdomen they have a tuft of dense gray-black hairs.

The eggs hatch in April.  The larvae feed on Crataegus, Quercus, Betula, Populus, Prunus and Berberis species. This univoltine species fly at night in September and October.

Distribution
It is found in Austria, Belgium, Bulgaria, Czech Republic, Germany, Hungary, Italy, the Netherlands, Poland, Serbia and Montenegro, Slovakia, and Spain.

Sources

References

 P. J. Van Helsdingen, Luc Willemse, Martin C. D. Speigh Background information on invertebrates of the Habitats Directive and the Bern Convention
 Moths and Butterflies of Europe and North Africa
 Fauna europaea
 Discovertarnavamare
 Lepiforum.de

Eriogaster
Moths described in 1758
Moths of Europe
Moths of Asia
Taxa named by Carl Linnaeus
Taxonomy articles created by Polbot